The Taian HTF5980 is a large transporter erector launcher used exclusively to carry the DF-41 Intercontinental Ballistic Missile. It is the largest known TEL used by the People's Liberation Army Rocket Force and the most powerful in terms of carrying capacity.

Description
The Taian HTF5980 is a 16x16 TEL that specialises in carrying superheavy ICBMs like the aforementioned DF-41s or sometimes the DF-31AG.  It is the first eight-axis self-propelled chassis made in China, equipped with a multi-axis steering system to meet the requirements of high manoeuvrability for a ground vehicle of such size.

Like most TELs made from Taian, it uses an integral welded structure frame, an oil-gas spring independent suspension and a multi-axle group steering and drives in order to achieve a high enough mobility to suit the PLARF.

One key difference of the HTF5980 in comparison to its smaller cousin, the HTF5680A1, is the introduction of a split-cab design. This was in order to accommodate the much larger missile canister of the DF-41 when at rest.

Variants
The HTF5980 itself comes in two varieties, the HTF5980A and HTF5980B, which are the launch vehicles and transport vehicles respectively.

See also
 TAS5380
 WS2400
 MAZ-7310
 HEMTT
 WS2600
 WS21200 
 WS51200

References

Military trucks of China
Military vehicles of the People's Republic of China